Hyphodontia sambuci, or elder whitewash, is a basidiomycete fungal pathogen on deadwood, especially elder.

It is resupinate, forming a very thin structure which is white, pruinose (flour-like dusting) or chalky in appearance. It is inedible. It also grows on dead but still hanging branches of Fraxinus, Berberis, Nothofagus, Ulmus, Populus, Hedera, Ribes, Symphoricarpos and rarely on conifers such as Cryptomeria.

Ecology 
As stated, H. sambuci occurs in North Europe mostly on Sambucus nigra, but there is a much bigger spectrum of substrates in warmer regions in southern areas. The variability of micromorphology increases in the tropics, but the macromorphological characteristics however always stay the same: the basidiocarp with chalky white color and often growing as aerophyte on dead branches of trees and bushes, that are still attached to the tree. H. sambuci consists of a complex of species. Similar species with capitate cystidia; thin-walled hyphae and exactly the same chalky white fruit body are H. griselinae and H. fimbriata. They can be differentiated by their spores and morphology of their basidiocarp.

References

External links 
 The Virtual Field Guide.
 Index Fungorum.
 USDA ARS Fungal Database.
 The National Biodiversity Network Gateway.
 World Wide distribution details

Fungal plant pathogens and diseases
Hymenochaetales
Fungi of Europe